The Apprenticeship of Duddy Kravitz may refer to:
The Apprenticeship of Duddy Kravitz (novel), a novel by Mordecai Richler
The Apprenticeship of Duddy Kravitz (film), based on the novel
The apprenticeship of Duddy Kravitz (musical), based on the novel by Mordecai Richler